The Musée Grévin – Forum des Halles was a wax museum located in the Forum des Halles, level 1, in the 1st arrondissement of Paris at 1 Rue Pierre Lescot, Paris, France. It opened in 1981 and closed in 1996.

The museum was an annex of its main Musée Grévin, and devoted to life in the Belle Époque (1885-1900). It featured 21 animated scenes with sound effects.

See also 
 List of museums in Paris

References 
 Paris.org description
 "France's Past Cast in Wax", The New York Times, November 8, 1987

Wax museums
History museums in France
Defunct museums in Paris
Museums established in 1981
1996 disestablishments in France
Museums disestablished in 1996
Belle Époque